Prichard Creek is a stream in Shoshone County, in the U.S. state of Idaho. It is a tributary of the Coeur d'Alene River.

History
Prichard Creek bears the name of Andrew J. Prichard, a gold prospector.

References

Rivers of Idaho
Rivers of Shoshone County, Idaho